TCF can mean:

Facilities and structures
TCF Center, Detroit, Michigan, USA; a convention center
TCF Stadium, Minneapolis, Minnesota, USA; of the University of Minnesota

Computing
Trenton Computer Festival, US
Tor Carding Forum, stolen credit card marketplace
Technical control facility in telecommunications
Transparency and Consent Framework in online advertising

Education
Test de connaissance du français, a test of knowledge of French
The Citizens Foundation, low-cost schools in Pakistan

Finance
TCF Financial Corporation, a holding company
 TCF Bank

Science
TCF-1 or HNF1A, a gene
TCF4 or TCF7L2, a protein transcription factor
TCF/LEF family of transcription factors, TCF7, etc.

Technology
Transparent conducting film, used in touch screens and solar cells
Trillion (1012) cubic feet
Totally Chlorine Free in bleaching of wood pulp

Other uses
Shuttle America (feeder airline ICAO code)
The Compassionate Friends, UK, for bereaved parents
Third Coast International Audio Festival

See also